Emil Hegetschweiler (1887–1959) was a Swiss actor.

Filmography

Bibliography
 Bergfelder, Tim & Bock, Hans-Michael. The Concise Cinegraph: Encyclopedia of German. Berghahn Books, 2009.
 Halbrook, Stephen P. The Swiss and the Nazis: How the Alpine Republic Survived in the Shadow of the Third Reich. Casemate Publishers, 2006.

External links

1887 births
1959 deaths
Swiss male film actors
Male actors from Zürich